The 2022 BCL Americas Final was the final game of the 2021–22 BCL Americas, the 3rd season of the league under its new entity and the 15th of the Pan-American premier basketball league organised by FIBA. It was played at the Arena Carioca 1 in Rio de Janeiro on 9 April 2022. The game was played between Brazilian club São Paulo and the Uruguayan club Biguá.

São Paulo won its first-ever continental title, just 4 years after the resurrection of the club's basketball section. Bruno Caboclo was the team's key player and won the league's MVP award.

Teams
In the following table, finals until 2020 were in the FIBA Americas League and South American Championship eras.

Road to the final

(H): Home game
(A): Away game
(N): Neutral venue

Game details

References

External links

2022
International sports competitions hosted by Brazil
2021–22 in South American basketball